Saúl Weisleder (born 11 October 1950) is a Costa Rican politician, academic, and diplomat. He served as Costa Rican Permanent representative to the United Nations  until 2014, as Speaker of the Legislative Assembly of Costa Rica from 1997 to 1998, and as a member of the Legislative Assembly of Costa Rica from 1994 to 1998.

Biography 
Weisleder was born in San José, on October 11, 1950 to a Jewish family. He graduated with a degree in economics and a Bachelor's degree in sociology from Universidad de Costa Rica, as well as a Master's degree in philosophy from University of Sussex.

Weisleder worked as a Professor in the Faculty of Social Sciences at the National University of Costa Rica, where he also served as dean. Outside of his academic work, he has served as a consultant to the banking and finance industries.

He is married to former Costa Rican Vice President Rebeca Grynspan Mayufis.

References 

National Liberation Party (Costa Rica) politicians
Costa Rican Jews
Costa Rican academics
Costa Rican economists
Members of the Legislative Assembly of Costa Rica
1950 births
People from San José, Costa Rica
University of Costa Rica alumni
Living people
European Ashkenazi Jews